Dada Kêfa Agbomantonligba Sagbadjou Glèlè (died 17 December 2021) was the King of Dahomey from 2019 until his death.

Early life and accession
He worked as a priest and had for most of his life. Dah Sagbadjou Glele was elected king by the royal families of Dahomey after his predecessor Agoli Agbo Dedjalagni died aged 84, and became Ahosu or King of Dahomey officially on 12 January 2019. Dah Sagbadjou Glele was appointed king of Dahomey with his consent. Dah Sagbadjou Glele was a grandson of Glele. Dah Sagbadjou Glele succeeded his kinsman.

Ahosu of Dahomey
Though little is known of the current royal family of Dahomey, Dah Sagbadjou Glele was considered the last living grandson of one of his predecessors, Glele who was also king of Dahomey. In Benin ancestral kings have no power, and Dah Sagbadjou Glele, although he was a king, was considered a religious leader and held no real power in modern day Benin. After getting chosen to succeed Agoli Agbo Dedjalagni, a court official stated, "This is a deserving choice, a choice of unity, under the anointing of all the girls and sons of the great Glele royal line."

He died on 17 December 2021 in his 90s.

References

20th-century births
2021 deaths
Year of birth unknown
21st-century Beninese people
21st-century monarchs in Africa
Kings of Dahomey
Beninese clergy